Robert of Beverley (died 1285) was a 13th-century British mason and sculptor who served as master mason of Westminster Abbey after Master John of Gloucester as well as contributing to the  Tower of London and a number of castles and manors as surveyor of the kings' works.

References
 Binski, Paul (1990) The Cosmati at Westminster and the English Court Style. The Art Bulletin 72(1):6-34.
Christopher Wilson (2004), ‘Beverley, Robert of (d. 1285)’, Oxford Dictionary of National Biography.

British sculptors
British male sculptors
1285 deaths
Year of birth unknown